Deep Diver was the name of a deep-sea scientific research submersible built by Edwin Albert Link. Deep Diver was the first small submersible designed for lockout diving, allowing divers to leave and enter the craft while underwater. It was first launched in January 1966.

Construction and design
Deep Diver was initially known as the Perry-Link #4 and was built in Riviera Beach, Florida by the Perry Submarine Company. Its name was subsequently changed to Deep Diver and its ownership transferred to Link's company, Ocean Systems, Inc. The submersible contained two compartments: a divers' compartment, developed from Link's earlier work with his Submersible Decompression Chamber (SDC), which allowed divers to be compressed to the ambient pressure of the ocean and leave the submersible to work underwater, and a pilots' compartment which remained at surface pressure, allowing the pilot and an observer to make dives without undergoing decompression. The two compartments were connected by a hatch which could be sealed off. Deep Diver was the first modern diver lock-out submersible.

It weighed 8.25 tons dry. The submersible featured no manipulators. It had twenty-one acrylic plastic viewports. A large battery pod containing four battery banks could be jettisoned in an emergency, providing an additional  of buoyancy.

Undersea missionsDeep Diver carried out many scientific missions in 1967 and 1968 operated from Link's underwater research vessel, Sea Diver. These included a  lockout dive in 1967 (at the same location as the 1964 Man in Sea dive by Robert Sténuit and Jon Lindbergh) and a  lockout dive near Great Stirrup Cay in 1968. Dr. Joseph B. MacInnis participated in both of these dives as an observer in Deep Diver's forward chamber. In September 1967 Deep Diver carried out a classified Ocean Systems mission on the Grand Banks south of Newfoundland. Two Navy divers had already died trying to recover it. A crew of four Ocean Systems personnel, including MacInnis, unsuccessfully attempted to recover the cable plow using the submersible. The mission was called off due to rising winds, and Deep Diver was barely brought safely back aboard the Canadian Coast Guard vessel CCGS John Cabot.MacInnis, pp. 81-90.

Decommissioning
Later in 1968, after Deep Diver had been requisitioned by the United States Navy to help search for the lost submarine USS Scorpion, the Bureau of Ships determined that Deep Diver was unsafe for use at great depths or in extremely cold temperatures because of the substitution of the wrong kind of steel, which became brittle in cold water, in some parts of the sub. Link proceeded to design a new lockout sub with a distinctive acrylic bubble as the forward pilot/observer compartment. In January 1971 the new sub was launched and commissioned to the Smithsonian Institution. It was named the Johnson Sea Link after its donors, Link and his friend John Seward Johnson I. Deep Diver'' was decommissioned and donated to the Smithsonian Institution. It was placed on display at the Marine Sciences Center in Fort Pierce, Florida.

References

Research submarines of the United States
Ships built in Florida
1966 ships